Daniel Gráč (15 March 1943 – 30 January 2008) was a Slovak cyclist. He competed in the individual road race at the 1964 Summer Olympics.

References

External links
 

1943 births
2008 deaths
Slovak male cyclists
Olympic cyclists of Czechoslovakia
Cyclists at the 1964 Summer Olympics
Sportspeople from Trenčín